Xiang or Hsiang; Changsha Xiang: sian1 y3), also known as Hunanese, is a group of linguistically similar and historically related Sinitic languages, spoken mainly in Hunan province but also in northern Guangxi and parts of neighboring Guizhou, Guangdong, Sichuan, Jiangxi and Hubei provinces. Scholars divided Xiang into five subgroups, Chang-Yi, Lou-Shao, Hengzhou, Chen-Xu and Yong-Quan. Among those, Lou-shao, also known as Old Xiang, still exhibits the three-way distinction of Middle Chinese obstruents, preserving the voiced stops, fricatives, and affricates. Xiang has also been heavily influenced by Mandarin, which adjoins three of the four sides of the Xiang speaking territory, and Gan in Jiangxi Province, from where a large population immigrated to Hunan during the Ming Dynasty.

Xiang-speaking Hunanese people have played an important role in Modern Chinese history, especially in those reformatory and revolutionary movements such as the Self-Strengthening Movement, Hundred Days' Reform, Xinhai Revolution  and Chinese Communist Revolution. Some examples of Xiang speakers are Mao Zedong, Zuo Zongtang, Huang Xing and Ma Ying-jeou.

History

Prehistory
Prehistorically, the main inhabitants were the ancient country of Ba, Nanman, Baiyue and other tribes whose languages cannot be studied. During the Warring States period, large numbers of Chu migrated into Hunan. Their language blended with that of the original natives to produce a new dialect Nanchu (Southern Chu). During Qin and Han dynasty, most part of today's Eastern Hunan belonged to Changsha Kingdom. According to Yang Xiong's Fangyan, people in this region spoke Southern Chu, which is considered the ancestor of Xiang Chinese today.

Middle ages and recent history
During the Tang dynasty, a large-scale emigration took place with people emigrating from the north to the south, bringing Middle Chinese into Hunan. Entering tone vowels started weakening in Hunan at this time. Migrants who came from the North mainly settled in northern Hunan followed by western Hunan. For this reason northern and western Hunan are Mandarin districts.

Migrants from Jiangxi concentrated mainly in southeastern Hunan and present day Shaoyang and Xinhua districts. They came for two reasons: The first is that Jiangxi became too crowded and its people sought expansion. The second is that Hunan suffered greatly during the Mongol conquest of the Song dynasty, when there was mass slaughter. The late Yuan Dynasty peasant uprising caused a great many casualties in Hunan.

During the Ming dynasty, a large-scale emigration from Jiangxi to Hunan took place. In the early Ming dynasty, large numbers of migrants came from Jiangxi and settled in present day Yueyang, Changsha, Zhuzhou, Xiangtan, and Hengyang districts. After the middle of the Ming dynasty, migrants came more diverse, and came more for economic reasons and commerce. Gan, which was brought by settlers from Jiangxi, influenced Xiang. The speech in east Hunan differentiated into New Xiang during that period.

Quanzhou County became part of Guangxi province after the adjustment of administrative divisions in the Ming Dynasty. Some features of Xiang at that time were kept in this region.

Languages and dialects

Since the classification of Yuan Jiahua (1960), Xiang has been considered one of seven major groups of varieties of Chinese.  Jerry Norman classified Xiang, Gan and Wu as central groups, intermediate between the Mandarin group to the north and the southern groups, Min, Hakka and Yue.

In Xiang languages, the voiced initials of Middle Chinese yield unaspirated initials in all tone categories.  A few varieties have retained voicing in all tones, but most have voiceless initials in some or all tone categories.

Yiyang
Yueyang
Changsha
Yongzhou
Quanzhou
Jishou
Chenxi
Hengyang
Shaoyang
Shuangfeng
Zixing

Pervasive influence from Mandarin dialects has made Xiang dialects difficult to classify.
Yuan Jiahua divided Xiang into New Xiang, in which voicing has been lost completely, and Old Xiang varieties, which retain voiced initials in at least some tones.  The Changsha dialect is usually taken as representative of New Xiang, while Shuangfeng dialect represents Old Xiang.  Norman describes the boundary between New Xiang and Southwestern Mandarin as one of the weakest in China, with considerable similarities between dialects near either side of the boundary, though more distant dialects are mutually unintelligible.
Indeed, Zhou Zhenhe and You Rujie (unlike most authors) classified New Xiang as part of Southwestern Mandarin.

The Language Atlas of China relabelled the New and Old Xiang groups as Chang-Yi and Lou-Shao respectively, and identified a third subgroup, Ji-Xu, in some parts of Western Hunan.  Bao & Chen (2005) split out part of Atlas's Chang-Yi subgroup as a new Hengzhou subgroup, and part of Lou-Shao as a Yong-Quan subgroup.  They also reclassified parts of the Ji–Xu subgroup as Southwestern Mandarin, renaming the remainder of the subgroup as Chen-Xu Xiang.  Their five subgroups are:

Chang-Yi
(17.8 million speakers) voiced initials in Middle Chinese become unaspirated voiceless consonant. Most of the dialects retain the entering tone as a separate category.
Lou-Shao
(11.5 million speakers) Voiced initials still exist. The entering tone does not exist in most of the dialects.
Chen-Xu Xiang
(3.4 million speakers) Some of the voiced consonants are retained.
Hengzhou Xiang
(4.3 million speakers)
Yong-Quan Xiang
(6.5 million speakers) Voiced consonants still exist.

Geographic distribution

Xiang is spoken by over 36 million people in China, primarily in the most part of the Hunan province, and in the five counties of Quanzhou, Guanyang, Ziyuan, Xing'an and Longsheng in northeastern Guangxi province, and in several places of Guizhou and Sichuan provinces. It is abutted by Southwestern Mandarin-speaking areas to the north and west, as well as by Gan in the eastern parts of Hunan and Jiangxi. Xiang is also in contact with the Qo-Xiong Miao and Tujia languages in West Hunan.

References

Bibliography 
 
 
 
 
 
 
 .

Further reading
 
[prototypical Old Xiang]

External links 

Xiang at Omniglot
Hunan Provincial Gazetteer: dialects 湖南省志: 方言志

 
Culture in Hunan
Languages of China
Subject–verb–object languages
Subgroups of the Han Chinese
Varieties of Chinese